Bihor may mean:

 Bihor County, in Romania
 Bihor Mountains, in Romania
 Bihor (fortress), in Montenegro
 Bihor (region), in Montenegro

See also
 Bihar (disambiguation)